Ministry of Information may refer to:

National government departments

 Ministry of Information (Bahrain), now known as the Information Affairs Authority
 Ministry of Information (Bangladesh)
 Ministry of Information and Communication (Bhutan)
 Ministry of Information (Cambodia)
 Ministry of Information (Czechoslovakia)
 Ministry of Information (Egypt)
 Minister of Information (France), a defunct position
 Ministry of Information and Broadcasting (India)
 Ministry of Information (Indonesia)
 Ministry of Information (Iran)
 Ministers of Information (Iraq), a list of Iraqi Information Ministers who served under Sadam Hussein
 Information and Diaspora Minister of Israel
 Ministry of Information (Kuwait)
 Ministry of Information (Lebanon)
 Ministry of Information, Communication and Culture (Malaysia)
 Ministry of Information (Myanmar)
 Ministry of Information, Broadcasting and National Heritage (Pakistan)
 Ministry of Media (Saudi Arabia)
 Ministry of Information (Serbia)
 Ministry of Communications and Information (Singapore)
 Ministry of Information, Posts and Telecommunication (Somalia)
 Ministry of Information (Syria)
 Ministry of Information, Culture and Sports, of Tanzania
 Ministry of Information Policy (Ukraine)
 Ministry of Information (United Kingdom)

Other uses
 Government department in the 1985 dystopian science fiction film Brazil

See also
 Department of Information (disambiguation)
Government Information Office
 Ministry of Information and Communication (disambiguation) of various countries
 Ministry of Information and Communication Technology (disambiguation) of several nations
 Ministry of Information and Broadcasting (disambiguation) of several states
 Ministry of propaganda
 Moi (disambiguation)